The following is a list of Polish brigade and division-sized military units during World War I and the subsequent Russian Civil War. See also list of military divisions. Official names are given in parentheses.

Formed in Russia during the Russian Civil War

Formed by Austria-Hungary

Formed by German Empire

References

World War I
 
Lists of military units and formations of World War I
Divisions in World War I
Divisions
Word War I divisions
Polish, World War I